The Best of Men is a factually based 2012 television film which describes the pioneering work of Dr Ludwig Guttmann with paraplegic patients at Stoke Mandeville Hospital, which led to the foundation of the Paralympic Games. It stars Eddie Marsan and Rob Brydon. The film won the Philadelphia Jewish Film Festival 34 Best Narrative Audience Award.

Plot

Ludwig Guttmann (Marsan) is a Jewish refugee from Nazi Germany, sponsored to stay in the United Kingdom by CARA, while his patients were injured British servicemen, initially bewildered at finding themselves under the care of one of "the enemy".

On arrival at the hospital, the patients are kept under sedation, and immobile in bed, a regime leading to bedsores, infection, and, in many cases, death. Dr Guttman insists that the best prognosis for the patients is if they are as mobile as possible. This leads him to clash with the existing staff of nurses and doctors at the hospital, who are accustomed to merely managing the decline of their patients.

As he gradually wins the staff over with his determination and optimism, Guttmann faces a further problem in the hopelessness of some of the patients, particularly exemplified by the youngest inmate, William Heath (MacKay), who joined the army from school. William's despair is contrasted with the irrepressible humour of veteran Wynn Bowen (Brydon), who offers a constant stream of irreverent comments from his bed.

Guttman hits on competitive exercise and sport as a way of both encouraging physical exercise and building self-esteem. Now in wheelchairs, the patients compete at hockey and basketball, and begin to re-connect to the outside world. The patients visit a local pub and challenge the regulars to arm-wrestling. The previously suicidal William engages in sport so enthusiastically that he breaks a leg, to the consternation of the other medical staff. Wynn is scheduled for a reunion with his wife in Wales, although this makes his composure crack over worries about his sexual performance. After Dr Guttman tells him "there is more than one way to skin a cat", he returns, jubilantly proclaiming that he "skinned the cat!".

Guttmann organises a national disability sport competition, the first Stoke Mandeville Games, in the hospital grounds. The film closes with captions describing how these developed into the Paralympics, and how Dr Guttmann was awarded a knighthood.

Cast
Dr Ludwig Guttmann - Eddie Marsan
Private William Heath - George Mackay
Cpl Wynne Bowen - Rob Brydon
Sister Edwards - Niamh Cusack
Dr Cowan - Richard McCabe
Major-General Harold Henry Blake - Nicholas Jones
Sgt "Q" Hills, PTI Instructor - Tristan Sturrock
Mr Heath - Nigel Lindsay
Mrs Heath - Rachael Spence
Nurse Carr - Leigh Quinn

Production
Written by Lucy Gannon, the show was produced by Whitby Davison for the BBC.

Location
The majority of the filming took place at three halls of residence in the University of Bristol: Wills Hall, Goldney Hall and Manor Hall.

References

External links
 

2012 television films
2012 films
BBC television dramas
Science docudramas
British docudrama films
2010s British films